KMKY (1310 AM) is a radio station licensed to Oakland, California that broadcasts with 5,000 watts. It calls itself "Radio Punjab" and airs programming in Hindi and Punjabi aimed at the San Francisco Bay Area's South Asian community. It is owned by Charanjit Batth, through licensee Radio Punjab AM 1310 Inc. Its transmitter is located in Oakland near the toll plaza for the San Francisco–Oakland Bay Bridge.

The 1310 AM frequency from 1959 to 1997 was the home of Urban adult contemporary and Gospel music KDIA. It later served as the San Francisco home of Radio Disney from 1997 to 2015, using the call sign KMKY, the last three letters standing for the Disney character Mickey Mouse.

History

KMKY is the second-oldest surviving radio station in the Bay Area. It began as KLS on  March 10, 1922 on 1200 kHz. It moved to 1220 kHz in 1927 then 1440 kHz in 1928. It moved to 1280 kHz in 1937 then 1310 kHz in 1941 as a result of the NARBA agreement. In 1945, when the station was owned by the Warner Brothers of Oakland, no relation to the movie studio, it changed its call letters to KWBR and changed its format to focus on an African-American audience. In 1959, it was bought by the owners of Memphis radio station WDIA, and the call letters were changed to KDIA. During the 1960s through the 1980s, the station was the premier soul and funk station in the San Francisco Bay Area. Sly Stone was a DJ at the station before launching Sly and the Family Stone.

In December 1984, the station was sold to Adam Clayton Powell III, who turned the station into KFYI, with an all-news format backed by a 32-member news team. After Powell failed to make payroll for KFYI — having lost a reported $4-million in funding invested by Aetna Insurance in less than six months on the air — the station went silent on April 9, 1985. It returned to air in July, however, having reclaimed its legacy KDIA call letters, while resuming its Urban Music format.

In the early 1990s, KDIA was co-owned by then mayor of Oakland, California, Elihu Harris, with then California Assembly Speaker Willie Brown. In 1992, the late Oakland journalist Chauncey Bailey returned to the Bay Area to work as public affairs director and newscaster on KDIA. Bailey later became the editor of the Oakland Post who was murdered on the streets of downtown Oakland. KDIA changed from gospel music to Radio Disney on December 15, 1997, when the station was sold to The Walt Disney Company. KDIA's first song as Radio Disney was "Cruella de Vil" from One Hundred and One Dalmatians.

On August 13, 2014, Disney put KMKY and 22 other Radio Disney stations up for sale, in order to focus more on digital distribution of the Radio Disney network.

On June 24, 2015, RD San Francisco Assets filed an application to sell KMKY to Radio Mirchi, for $600,000. The sale was completed on October 6, 2015. Radio Disney programming for the region later moved to the KLLC HD3 digital subchannel, where it aired until June 2018.

References

External links
FCC History Cards for KMKY

The Early History Of KLS/KWBR/KDIA Oakland, California

1922 establishments in California
Asian-American culture in Oakland, California
Hindi-language radio stations
Indian-American culture in California
Pakistani-American culture in California
Punjabi-American culture
Punjabi-language mass media
Radio stations established in 1922
MKY
South Asian American culture
Former_subsidiaries_of_The_Walt_Disney_Company
Radio stations licensed before 1923 and still broadcasting